Nacoleia defloralis is a moth in the family Crambidae. It was described by Snellen in 1880. It is found in Indonesia, where it has been recorded from Sulawesi.

References

Moths described in 1912
Taxa named by George Hampson
Nacoleia
Moths of Indonesia